Alexei Voronov (born September 29, 1977) is a Russian former professional ice hockey defenceman.

Career
Voronov began his career with his hometown team Avtomobilist Yekaterinburg who later became Spartak Yekaterinburg and Dinamo-Energija Yekaterinburg. He played with the team from 1993 to 2003, playing in the Russian Superleague until their relegation to the Vysshaya Liga 2001.

He then moved to Sputnik Nizhny Tagil of the Vysshaya Liga in 2003 and stayed for four seasons before returning to Yekaterinburg in 2007 to join Avtomobilist Yekaterinburg, a new team founded the previous year to replace the former Dinamo-Energija team that folded in 2006. He then spent a season with Yugra Khanty-Mansiysk before returning to Avtomobilist for the 2009–10 KHL season, playing 44 games and scoring six goals and seven assists.

Voronov then spent the next two seasons in the Supreme Hockey League for Sputnik Nizhny Tagil and HC Mechel Chelyabinsk as well as in the Kazakhstan Hockey Championship for Beibarys Atyrau. After two seasons of inactivity, Voronov signed with Hungarian team Debreceni HK of the MOL Liga for one season. He then spent a year with HK Dukla Michalovce of the Slovak 1. Liga before moving to the United Arab Emirates to play for White Bears Dubai in the Emirates Ice Hockey League in 2016. He spent two seasons with the team, after which he retired for the second time in 2018.

References

External links

1977 births
Living people
Avtomobilist Yekaterinburg players
Beibarys Atyrau players
HK Dukla Michalovce players
HC Mechel players
Russian ice hockey defencemen
Sportspeople from Yekaterinburg
Sputnik Nizhny Tagil players
HC Yugra players
Russian expatriate ice hockey people
Russian expatriate sportspeople in Hungary
Russian expatriate sportspeople in Slovakia
Russian expatriate sportspeople in Kazakhstan
Expatriate ice hockey players in Slovakia
Expatriate ice hockey players in Hungary
Expatriate ice hockey players in Kazakhstan
Russian expatriate sportspeople in the United Arab Emirates
Expatriate ice hockey players in the United Arab Emirates